The 2002–03 NCAA Division III men's ice hockey season began on October 18, 2002 and concluded on March 22 of the following year. This was the 30th season of Division III college ice hockey.

The NCAA changed the national tournament format to have all rounds be Single elimination. As a result, the mini-game was eliminated from the Championship.

Regular season

Season tournaments

Standings

Note: Mini-game are not included in final standings

2003 NCAA Tournament

Note: * denotes overtime period(s)

See also
 2002–03 NCAA Division I men's ice hockey season

References

External links

 
NCAA